Willenabrina is a small farming district located midway between the towns of Warracknabeal and Rainbow in the Wimmera region of northwest Victoria, Australia.

History
Originally gazetted as a railway township in the late 1880s (the Post Office opened on June 14, 1889 (closed in 1942), Willenabrina failed to develop when the railway line route beyond Warracknabeal was redirected. A few small shops, a school, a community hall, and a couple of churches, existed around the time of the First World War, along with a sports oval and tennis courts, however none of these facilities remain today.

References

External links

Wimmera